Bekdik is a village in the Sarıyahşi District, Aksaray Province, Turkey. Its population is 288 (2021).

References

Villages in Sarıyahşi District